Shy Boy is the third extended play (first Japanese release) by South Korean girl group Secret. The EP was released on November 16, 2011, it contains six songs. All songs are remakes of Secret's Korean songs including "Shy Boy" and "Starlight Moonlight".

Release
The plans of "Shy Boy" as Secret's second Japanese single was first announced on August 28, 2011. On September 28, 2011, teasers for the "Shy Boy" music video was released. The official music video was revealed on October 8, 2011. On November 8, 2011, the official music video for "Christmas Magic", a remake of "Starlight Moonlight" with a new Christmas beat was unveiled. The EP was released to music stores on November 16, 2011.

On November 22, 2011, it was announced that a Christmas Edition of the album will be released to music stores on December 7, 2011. The album cover is themed after Christmas, with Secret wearing clothing resembling Santa Claus.

Promotions
To promote the album, Secret appeared on a Japanese variety show, Made in BS Japan on October 12, 2011. Also, Secret had a Shy Boy Album Release Party at the BRITZ at Akasaka on November 16, 2011.

Track listing

Chart

Release history

References

External links

2011 EPs
Secret (South Korean band) EPs
TS Entertainment EPs
Sony Music Entertainment Japan EPs